Peracle charlotteae is an extinct species of fossil pelagic sea snail, or "sea butterfly", a planktonic marine gastropod mollusk in the family Peraclidae.

This species existed in what is now Cyprus during the Miocene period. It was described by Arie W. Janssen and Crispin T. S. Little in 2010.

References

Peraclidae
Miocene gastropods
Fossil taxa described in 2010
Gastropods described in 2010